Hillhead is a district of Glasgow, Scotland.

Hillhead or Hill Head may also refer to:

Hillhead (ward), an electoral ward of the Glasgow City Council
Glasgow Hillhead (UK Parliament constituency)
Hillhead, Cornwall, a hamlet in England
Hillhead, Devon, a location in England
Hillhead, East Ayrshire, a location in Scotland
Hillhead, Keithhall and Kinkell, a location in Aberdeenshire, Scotland
Hillhead, Kinellar, a location in Aberdeenshire, Scotland
Hillhead, South Ayrshire, a location in Scotland
Hillhead, South Dakota, a community in the United States
Hill Head, a village in Hampshire, England
Hillhead of Mountblairy, a location in Aberdeenshire, Scotland